The Rural Municipality of Saskatchewan Landing No. 167 is a rural municipality (RM) in the Canadian province of Saskatchewan within Census Division No. 8 and  Division No. 3.

History 
The RM of Saskatchewan Landing No. 167 incorporated as a rural municipality on January 1, 1913.

Geography

Communities and localities 
The following urban municipalities are surrounded by the RM.

Villages
 Stewart Valley

The following unincorporated communities are within the RM.

Localities
 Leinan

Demographics 

Economy 
Agriculture is the major industry in the RM.

Attractions 
The Saskatchewan Landing Provincial Park is located within the RM.

Government 
The RM of Saskatchewan Landing No. 167 is governed by an elected municipal council and an appointed administrator that meets on the third Monday of every month. The reeve of the RM is Darwin Johnsgaard while its administrator is Kayla Powell. The RM's office is located in Stewart Valley.

References 

Saskatchewan Landing